Ritchie Fontaine, also known as Lil Ric is an American rapper from Richmond, California, United States, formally of No Limit and Noo Trybe Records. Lil Ric has worked with numerous other Californian rappers including Laroo, JT the Bigga Figga, Keak da Sneak,  San Quinn and The Jacka.

Music career
On October 11, 1994, Lil Ric would release his debut album titled Deep n tha Game, it would be one of No Limit's first album releases. In 1996 after disbanding from No Limit on May 14, 1996, Lil Ric would release his second album titled Wicked Streets via Solo Records. On August 8, 2000, Lil Ric would release his third album titled It's Like Armageddon via A.W.O.L., Noo Trybe, Virgin. On February 26, 2001, Fiend would release his fourth album titled The Thug Nut (On One) via Concrete Music. On August 28, 2012, Lil Ric would release his fifth album titled Plugged In - Live from the Streets via Ae'on Music Group Rapbay, Urbanlife Distribution, it would be his first album release in 11 years.

Discography

Studio albums

Collaboration albums

Singles

As lead artist

References 

Living people
Year of birth missing (living people)
21st-century American male musicians
21st-century American rappers
African-American male rappers
Gangsta rappers
G-funk artists
Musicians from Richmond, California
No Limit Records artists
Rappers from the San Francisco Bay Area
West Coast hip hop musicians
21st-century African-American musicians